The Masked Singer is a British reality singing competition television series that premiered on ITV on 4 January 2020. It is based on the Masked Singer franchise which originated from the South Korean version of the show King of Mask Singer. In February 2022, the show was recommissioned for a fourth and fifth series. The show won an International Emmy for Best Non-Scripted Entertainment in 2021.

Production
On 31 May 2019, it was announced that ITV was producing a local version of the South Korean television singing competition King of Mask Singer, originally broadcast by the Munhwa Broadcasting Corporation, for the British television market. The production is made by British television production company Bandicoot, part of the Argonon Group.

On 25 January 2020, it was announced that the show would be returning for a second series. On 30 April 2020, it was reported that they were considering filming the new series without an audience due to the COVID-19 pandemic. It was later announced on 17 August 2020 that filming would begin on 14 September with safety precautions in place. On 1 December 2020, it was announced that the second series would premiere on 26 December 2020, with a "The Story So Far" recap airing on 19 December.

On 14 February 2022, following the conclusion of the third series, ITV announced the commission of a fourth and fifth series. The fourth series began on 1 January 2023.

Cast

Panellists and host

Following the announcement of the series, it was confirmed by ITV that the panel would consist of presenter and comedian Jonathan Ross, television presenter Davina McCall, US actor and comedian Ken Jeong (who is also a panellist on the American version of the programme), and singer-songwriter and actress Rita Ora. It was also confirmed that Joel Dommett would host the show.

On 19 August 2020, it was announced that British comedian Mo Gilligan would replace Ken Jeong on the panel for series two, due to travel restrictions from COVID-19 preventing his participation.

Series overview

Awards and nominations

Spin-offs and related shows

ITV2 one-off special
On 26 April 2020, Dommett invited panellists McCall and Ross to appear on his show, Home Alone with Joel Dommett, on ITV2 to take part in a one-off special of The Masked Singer. With COVID-19 spreading and residents of the United Kingdom under lockdown, Dommett had to conference call the panellists where they had to guess the identities of three masked celebrities. McCall and Ross were tasked with not only guessing their identities, but also deciding on an overall 'winner' and 'runner-up'.

The celebrities' performances were pre-recorded and consisted of them singing, followed by a hint to their identity, before their reveal at the end of the segment. Rather than the typical costumes and masks that contestants usually wear on the show, the recordings were edited to hide each singer's face with a specific image.

The Masked Singer: Unmasked
The Masked Singer: Unmasked is the companion show presented by Capital Xtra's Will Njobvu. It is shown on the ITV Hub straight after the main show and is later aired on ITV2 the following Saturday. The show features interviews from the judges and the unmasked celebrity from that episode. It takes us behind the scenes to see what actually goes on at the "most secretive show on TV".

The Masked Dancer

On 4 March 2021, it was announced that ITV commissioned a dancing spinoff series that shares the same name of the American version. The series had 12 contestants competing through seven episodes, and was hosted by Dommett, with Ross, Gilligan, McCall, and Oti Mabuse serving as panellists. It premiered on 29 May 2021, filling in the late spring 2021 slot of Britain's Got Talent, which had its upcoming series 15 postponed until 2022 due to health and safety concerns regarding the COVID-19 pandemic.

The Masked Singer: I'm a Celebrity Special
On 30 August 2022, it was announced that ITV had commissioned a one-off I'm a Celebrity...Get Me Out of Here! special of The Masked Singer, would air on 6 November 2022, ahead of the launch show for the 2022 series. The special saw four former campmates perform in costume, with their identities revealed over the course of the episode. Joel Dommett hosted the special and was joined by regular The Masked Singer panelists Mo Gilligan, Davina McCall, Rita Ora, and Jonathan Ross, as well as special guests.

 Group performance: "Down Under" by Men at Work

The Masked Singer Live tour
A live arena tour of the show began during the 2022 Easter holidays, travelling across the UK. The tour consists of two touring judges, Denise van Outen (who appeared as "Fox" in series one) and Aston Merrygold (who appeared as "Robin" in series two), with a guest judge at each location. Panda, Dragon, Unicorn, Badger and Traffic Cone star on the tour with two new characters: Space Pug and Baby Dino, who are unmasked at every performance.

See also
 Masked Singer franchise

References

External links
 
 

 
2020 British television series debuts
2020s British music television series
2020s British reality television series
ITV (TV network) original programming
English-language television shows
British television series based on South Korean television series